The 2012 Zimbabwe Premier Soccer League season (known as the Castle Larger Premier Soccer League for sponsorship reasons) will be the thirty second season of the Zimbabwe Premier Soccer League since its establishment in 1980. The season began on 31 March 2012.

Dynamos are the defending champions, having won the previous 2011 Zimbabwe Premier Soccer League season. The season will feature 12 teams from the 2011 ZPSL season and four new teams promoted from the 2011 Zifa Division One League: Buffaloes, Harare City, Hardbody and Quelaton who replace relegated Kiglon, Masvingo United, Shooting Stars and Zimbabwe Saints.

Teams
A total of 16 teams will contest the league, including 12 sides from the 2011 season and four promoted from the 2011 Zifa Division One League.

Stadiums and locations
Football teams in South Africa tend to use multiple stadiums over the course of a season for their home games. The following table will only indicate the stadium used most often by the club for their home games

League table

 No team from Zimbabwe entered the 2013 CAF Confederation Cup.

References

External links
Zimbabwe Premier Soccer League
SoccerWay
ZPSL Results
ZPSL Standings

2012 in Zimbabwean sport
2011–12 in African association football leagues
2012–13 in African association football leagues